Peschany is a rural locality (a settlement) in Kuybyshevsky Selsoviet, Rubtsovsky District, Altai Krai, Russia. The population was 4 as of 2013. There are 4 streets.

Geography 
Peschany is located 23 km northwest of Rubtsovsk (the district's administrative centre) by road. Peschany Borok is the nearest rural locality.

References 

Rural localities in Rubtsovsky District